Ernest Rudolph Johnson (April 29, 1888 – May 1, 1952) was an American professional baseball shortstop. He played in Major League Baseball (MLB) for the Chicago White Sox (1912, 1921–23), St. Louis Terriers (Federal League 1915), St. Louis Browns (1916–1918), and New York Yankees (1923–1925). In between, he spent  with the Salt Lake City Bees as their player-manager.

Johnson took over the White Sox shortstop job from the recently banned Swede Risberg in 1921.  He hit .295 and was fourth in the American League with 22 stolen bases.  In 1922 his batting average dropped to .254 and he had the dubious distinction of leading the league in outs (494).

He was acquired by the Yankees via waivers on May 31, 1923 and he batted .447 for them in a limited role.  He played in two games of the 1923 World Series against the New York Giants and scored the series-deciding run as a pinch runner in game number six. Johnson spent the next two years with New York in a part-time role, batting .353 and .282.  On October 28, 1925 at age 37, Johnson was sent to the St. Paul Saints of the American Association as part of a multi-player trade.

Johnson's career totals for 813 games include 697 hits, 19 home runs, 257 runs batted in, 372 runs scored, a .266 batting average, and a slugging percentage of .350.

After Johnson's playing career, he spent several years as a manager in the minor leagues. He managed the Portland Beavers from  until  and the Seattle Indians from  until . After that, he worked for the Boston Red Sox as an advance scout until his death in 1952.

His son was former major league second baseman Don Johnson. His brother, George, was a long-time minor league umpire.

Sources

External links

1888 births
1952 deaths
Baseball players from Chicago
Boston Red Sox scouts
Chicago Green Sox players
Chicago White Sox players
Dubuque Hustlers players
Los Angeles Angels (minor league) players
Major League Baseball shortstops
New York Yankees players
Portland Beavers managers
Portland Beavers players
St. Louis Browns players
St. Louis Terriers players
Salt Lake City Bees players
Seattle Indians players